Ngāti Ākarana is a Māori cultural club in Auckland, New Zealand. It is a pan-tribal group of urban Māori who have migrated to Auckland (similar groups are Ngāti Poneke in Wellington and Ngāti Rānana in London). "" is a Māori-language approximation of the name Auckland.

References

Māori culture in Auckland
Urban Māori